The Mark Morris Memorial Bridge (locally called the North Bridge) is a 2 lane truss bridge across the Mississippi River in the United States. It connects the cities of Clinton, Iowa and Fulton, Illinois. The bridge may also be known as the Lyons-Fulton Bridge, which was the name of a predecessor bridge and the name listed on the USGS topographical map. The town of Lyons, Iowa, was annexed to Clinton in 1895, but the northern end of the city is still referred to as Lyons. The bridge is the terminus of both Iowa Highway 136 and Illinois Route 136. The 1975 bridge was named in memory Mark Morris, a long time member of the City of Clinton Bridge Commission who died in 1972. Morris was instrumental in the construction of the 1975 bridge and the City of Clinton Bridge Commission named it in his honor.

The bridge was opened in January 1975, replacing an older span upstream that once carried the Lincoln Highway, U.S. Route 30.) In 1982, Iowa DOT announced that it would be removing a 20 cent toll from the Gateway Bridge and the Mark Morris bridge beginning January 1983. Iowa and Illinois agreed to split responsibility for the maintenance of the two bridges with Iowa maintaining the Mark Morris bridge and Illinois the Gateway bridge.

1891 bridge 
The older span was originally built in 1891 with a wooden deck; this was replaced in 1933 with a metal grate to allow snow to melt through. He was paid $1.00 per foot for this stunt.

See also 
 
 
 
 
 List of crossings of the Upper Mississippi River

References 

Truss bridges in the United States
Bridges over the Mississippi River
Road bridges in Illinois
Lincoln Highway
Bridges completed in 1891
Bridges completed in 1975
Buildings and structures in Clinton, Iowa
Bridges in Clinton County, Iowa
Road bridges in Iowa
1891 establishments in Iowa
Former toll bridges in Iowa
Former toll bridges in Illinois
Bridges of the United States Numbered Highway System
1891 establishments in Illinois
Metal bridges in the United States
Interstate vehicle bridges in the United States
U.S. Route 30